The Timbavati Private Nature Reserve is located at the border line between Hoedspruit (in Limpopo) and Acornhoek (in Mpumalanga), north of the Sabi Sand Private Game Reserve on the western edge of Kruger National Park. Geographically and politically, Timbavati is located in Mpumalanga Province. In Xitsonga, the name 'Timbavati' means "the place where something sacred came down to Earth from the Heavens", and refers to the rare white lions of Timbavati.

The reserve was established in 1956 by like-minded game farmers with the creation of the Timbavati Association. Timbavati is part of Associated Private Nature Reserves (APNR) and the fences separating Timbavati from the other member reserves in the APNR and from the Kruger National Park has been removed. Wildlife, including lions, cheetahs, elephants and other species, roam freely between these reserves. Ngala (meaning 'lion' in Tsonga) and Motswari game reserves have been amalgamated into Timbavati.

History
In 1956, a group of conservation minded landowners formed the Timbavati Association with the aim to reclaim the land for the benefit of all. They had come together after witnessing the degradation of a once pristine wilderness area.

Insensitive land use (primarily crop and cattle farming) had caused soil erosion and destruction of indigenous plant species. In addition, natural water sources had been rerouted by dams further impacting on the natural status quo. As a result, much of the wildlife common to the area was lost.

Since the formation of the Timbavati Association, every landowner in the area has been encouraged to join in the conservation effort. Today there are over 50 members who have succeeded in restoring the land to its former glory, with diverse and rare wildlife species making the Timbavati their home.

In 1993, in recognition of the importance of the area, the fences between the Kruger National Park and the Timbavati Reserve were removed to encourage natural species migration.

Man's incursions into this part of the Lowveld have always been temporary and brief, from early stone age down to the early 20th century. In point of fact, large tracts of land in the northern portion of the Lowveld were never permanently settled by man. The lands now comprising the Timbavati were barely touched, and are still only lightly inhabited. This part of South Africa's bushveld region may therefore be regarded as truly unspoiled and deserves recognition as genuine wild land, as opposed to the "restored" and "restocked" lands commonly found elsewhere.

Geography
The Timbavati Private Nature Reserve is located in the Mpumalanga province of South Africa between latitudes 24° 34’ S and 24° 03’ S and longitudes 31° 03’ E and 31° 31’ E.
The Timbavati Reserve consists of 50 contiguous tracts of land housing 12 luxury tourist lodges.

The reserve forms part of the Greater Kruger National Park and lies nestled between the Kruger National Park on the east, the Klaserie and Umbabat Game Reserves in the north and the Thornybush Game Reserve in the west. There are no fences between the Timbavati and the Kruger National Park which allows free movement of wildlife between the reserves.

The southern border of this great complex of public and privately owned protected land lies close to the Kingdom of Eswatini and abuts the boundaries of Zimbabwe in the north and Mozambique in the east.

The terrain is undulating with altitudes varying between 300 and 500m above sea level. The area is characterised as 'savanna bushveld' with 6 different landscape types: acacia woodland, open woodland, mopane woodland, combretum woodland, mixed combretum woodland and mixed veld on Gabbro. Bush elephants, African buffaloes, kudu, Burchell's zebras, blue wildebeests, Cape giraffes, impalas, waterbucks and warthogs abound together with their attendant predators including lions, African leopards, South African cheetahs and spotted hyena. The endangered Cape wild dog is also a regular visitor to the Timbavati Game Reserve. The larger and rarer antelopes such as roan antelope, common eland and tsessebe have been slow to return to this area and their numbers are still critically low.

The climate is typified by a summer wet season (October–March) with the majority of rain falling between December and February. This is also the hottest time of the year, with temperatures in the region of 32 °C. A typical summer day will be hot with storm clouds gathering for a spectacular late afternoon thunderstorm.

During the winter months (April–September) the weather is dry with little chance of rain. As game tends to congregate around dwindling water sources, game viewing is more predictable. Temperatures can range from 28 °C to 10 °C in one day. The mornings and evenings can be very cold and warm clothing is very strongly recommended.

Flora and fauna

Timbavati is home to:
Over 40 mammals, including the African Big Five: lion, African elephant, African Buffalo, African leopard and black rhinoceros.
Over 360 bird species.
79 species of reptiles.
49 species of fish.
85 listed species of trees.

White lions

When the white lions of the Timbavati were discovered in the mid-1970s they became the subject of much interest and debate. The story of the "White Lions of the Timbavati" has been told by several people, including Chris McBride. McBride was the son of Timbavati member Cyril McBride, who at the time owned the farm Vlakgezicht, together with his brother Robert.

Lions with a recessive gene causing the coats to be snow white (though not albino) reappeared in the Timbavati in 2006 after an absence of many years. Their white coats are not the product of albinism, a relatively common condition resulting from a failure to develop pigment, but from another condition called "leucism," in which the pelt is white but eyes and skin are pigmented. The condition is rare and also termed a "chinchilla mutation." It is thought to represent an evolutionary stage in the progressive loss of pigmentation. The white mutation, which affects two of the pigments involved in coat coloration, is expressed only when two conditions pertain:
(1) Both parents carry the recessive "white gene";
(2) the offspring inherit the recessive gene of each parent. If a cub receives a dominant "tawny" gene from either parent, its pelt will
be tawny. Thus a litter may contain both tawny and white cubs.

Disease

Malaria is present in the area.

See also
 Associated Private Nature Reserves
 Kruger National Park
 Protected areas of South Africa
 Timbavati River
 White lion
 Mia and the White Lion

References

Protected areas of Mpumalanga
Nature reserves in South Africa